Constance Vera Browne, Baroness Oranmore and Browne (née Stevens; 14 February 1915 – 24 September 2006), commonly known as Sally Gray, was an English film actress of the 1930s and 1940s. Her obituary in The Irish Times described her as "once seen as a British rival to Ginger Rogers."

According to her obituary in The Independent: "In the Thirties she was a charming soubrette of light movies and musical comedy. After a break from performing, she emerged in the mid-Forties as a sultry beauty who starred in a series of moody dramas and potent thrillers."

Biography

Early life
Born Constance Vera Stevens in Holloway, London, Gray was the daughter of Charles Stevens, who drove a motor cab, and his wife, Gertrude Grace. Her mother was a ballet dancer and her grandmother a "principal boy" in the 1870s. Her father died when Gray was young.

Theatre career
She trained as a child at Fay Compton's School of Dramatic Art, and began acting on stage at the age of 10. Gray made her professional stage debut at the age of twelve in All God's Chillun at the Globe Theatre in London, playing an African boy.  When she was 14, Gray appeared in a minstrel show at the Gate Theatre in London. She made her film debut with a bit part in The School for Scandal (1930).

She then returned to school for two years, training at Fay Compton's School of Dramatic Art, during which time she performed in cabarets.

She appeared in The Gay Divorce (1933) on stage with Fred Astaire. The agent John Gliddon saw her in the musical Jill Darling (1934) and signed her.

Film career
Gray returned to films in 1935, with The Dictator (1935). She could also be seen in Cross Currents (1935), Radio Pirates (1935), Lucky Days (1935), and Checkmate (1935).  She returned on stage and was spotted by Stanley Lupino, who fell in love with her.

Gray had the female lead in Cheer Up (1936) with Stanley Lupino. She had leads in Calling the Tune (1936), Cafe Colette (1936), and Saturday Night Revue (1937) with Billy Milton. In 1936, she was earning £150 a week.  Gray had support roles in Lightning Conductor (1937), a thriller; Over She Goes (1937) with Lupino; Mr. Reeder in Room 13 (1937), a non musical; and Hold My Hand (1938) with Lupino. Gray was the female lead in Sword of Honour (1938), The Saint in London (1939) with George Sanders, The Lambeth Walk (1939) with Lupino Lane, and A Window in London (1940), a non musical film with Michael Redgrave. Gray was in Olympic Honeymoon (1940) then had the female lead in The Saint's Vacation (1941). She had a sensitive role in Brian Desmond Hurst's romantic melodrama Dangerous Moonlight (1941). The same year she appeared in the West End musical Lady Behave which had been written by her co-star Stanley Lupino. The show had to close early because of Lupino's illness.

Gray returned to the stage to star in My Sister Eileen (1942) with Coral Browne. Lupino died, leaving Gray £10,000. Gray had a nervous breakdown, resulting in her retirement for several years.

Comeback
Gray returned to the screen in 1946 and made her strongest bid for stardom in a series of melodramas. They include the hospital thriller Green for Danger (1946), Carnival (1946),  They Made Me a Fugitive (1947)  and The Mark of Cain (1948). Gray then made Silent Dust (1948) and Edward Dmytryk's film noir piece Obsession (1949), in which she plays Robert Newton's faithless wife. Her final film was the spy yarn Escape Route (1952).

RKO executives, impressed with Gray, authorised producer William Sistrom to offer her a long-term contract if she would move to the United States. John Paddy Carstairs, director of The Saint in London, also thought she could be a star. However, she declined the offer and instead retired in 1952 after her marriage.

Personal life
Gray married the 4th Baron Oranmore and Browne, an Anglo-Irish peer, on 1 December 1951, and lived in County Mayo, Ireland. The couple kept the marriage secret until the 1953 coronation of Elizabeth II, at which she appeared with her husband.

In the early 1960s, they returned to England and settled in a flat in Eaton Place, Belgravia, London. The couple had no children.

Death
Gray died on 24 September 2006, at 91 years of age, in London, England.

Filmography

Film

References

Sources

External links
 
 Sally Gray: Film beauty who rejected Hollywood for England and the aristocracy Obituary in The Guardian

1915 births
2006 deaths
Actresses from London
Mereworth
Oranmore and Browne
English film actresses
People from Holloway, London
20th-century English actresses